John Crittenden Duval (1816–1897) was an American writer of Texas literature. He has been noted as being the first Texas man of letters  and was dubbed the "Father of Texas Literature" by J. Frank Dobie. His Early Times in Texas was initially published serially in 1867 in Burke's Weekly (Macon, Georgia) and was finally published in book form in 1892. The story, which became a Texas classic, recounted Duval's escape from the Goliad Massacre, in which his brother, Burr H. Duval, was killed, as well as other tales.

Another brother, Thomas Howard DuVal, was a distinguished Texas judge. Their father, William Pope Duval, was the Territorial Governor of Florida from 1822 to 1834.

References

Further reading
Corner, William. John Crittenden Duval: The Last Survivor of the Goliad Massacre" in Southwestern Historical Quarterly Online, v. 1, n. 1, pp. 47–67.

External links
John C. Duval's Account of the Goliad Massacre
John Crittenden Duval in the Handbook of Texas Online

1816 births
1897 deaths
19th-century American historians
Writers from Texas
American male non-fiction writers
19th-century American male writers